Spark and Burn is an original novel based on the U.S. television series Buffy the Vampire Slayer.

Plot summary

Spike was born in the nineteenth century as a gentle, intellectual boy named William. As a young adult, he meets a woman called Drusilla, a mysterious vampire. William eventually becomes Spike.

He travels Europe with a band of vicious vampires, Dru, Darla, and Angelus. They show him his new existence, and from them he finds out about that most serious of enemies to vampires, one girl in all the world chosen to fight the vampires and the forces of darkness, the Slayer.

Having found a soul in Africa in the twenty-first century, Spike is tormented by the first evil and the guilt of his vampiric evils. He recalls many of the events that would lead him to the madness in the hell-influenced basement of the new Sunnydale High School.

Continuity
Most of the story is supposed to be set during the seventh season episode "Lessons". However the memories Spike recalls span the whole of Spike's history in the Buffyverse. For example, why he was on a World War II sub ("Why We Fight"), and his earlier memories of the Scooby gang whilst he spied on them in "Reptile Boy".

Canonical issues

Buffy books such as this one are not usually considered by fans as canonical. Some fans consider them stories from the imaginations of authors and artists, while other fans consider them as taking place in an alternative fictional reality. However unlike fan fiction, overviews summarising their story, written early in the writing process, were 'approved' by both Fox and Joss Whedon (or his office), and the books were therefore later published as officially Buffy/Angel merchandise.

See also

Spike comics
Old Times
Spike vs Dracula
Old Wounds
Lost and Found
Spike & Dru
Asylum

Spike novels
Blackout
Pretty Maids All in a Row
Spark and Burn

External links

Reviews
Teen-books.com - Reviews of this book

2005 novels
Books based on Buffy the Vampire Slayer